Alphas Leken Kishoyian (born 12 October 1994) is a Kenyan sprinter.

Kishoyian won a silver medal in the 400 metres at the 2011 World Youth Championships in Athletics, losing to Arman Hall. He also won a silver medal in the 400 m at the 2011 Commonwealth Youth Games, losing to Clovis Asong.

International competitions

References

External links

1994 births
Living people
Kenyan male sprinters
Athletes (track and field) at the 2010 Summer Youth Olympics
Olympic athletes of Kenya
Athletes (track and field) at the 2012 Summer Olympics
Athletes (track and field) at the 2016 Summer Olympics
World Athletics Championships athletes for Kenya
Athletes (track and field) at the 2019 African Games
African Games competitors for Kenya